Powerland Heritage Park, formerly known as Antique Powerland, is a collection of museums and a self-described heritage site for power equipment, such as farm machinery, commercial trucks, trains, construction equipment, and the engines which power them.  It is located in Brooks, Oregon, United States (near Salem, Oregon), and is operated by the non-profit Antique Powerland Museum Association.  It was initially established by a group of enthusiasts "dedicated to the preservation, restoration and demonstration of steam powered equipment, antique farm machinery and implements."

The museum is located on a  parcel of land just off Interstate 5 in Brooks, and has been in operation (in various forms) since the 1970s.  Originally, the site was primarily used for "threshing bees", a forerunner to the modern tractor pull, and the remainder of the site committed to farming.  With the addition of a truck museum and a railroad museum, the entire grounds were dedicated to exhibits; the current structure of Antique Powerland has been in operation since 1996.

Each summer, Antique Powerland presents the Great Oregon Steam-Up, wherein many of the exhibits are fired up and displayed in an operational state.  Despite the name, many different types of power equipment are displayed, including steam-powered equipment, diesel-powered equipment, gasoline-powered equipment, and electric-powered equipment.

Antique Powerland was renamed Powerland Heritage Park in spring 2017.

Exhibits and member museums 

Antique Powerland is structured as a collection of museums, some indoor and some outdoor, each operating together on the Antique Powerland site.  The various museums focus on different types of equipment, and have different exhibits on display.  Many of the exhibits are interactive; there are several operating trains on the property which visitors can ride.

Member museums, along with the equipment exhibited, include:

 Western Steam Friends Association.  A steam heritage group, which exhibits and operates various types of steam-powered equipment, including tractors, a rail-mounted steam crane, and an operating wood-fired, steam-powered sawmill, which is used to mill lumber for exhibit construction.
 Branch 15 - Early Day Gas Engines & Tractors Association.  An organization which exhibits small engines, tractors, and related farm implements. Operates a museum housing machinery from the Wolf Iron Warks dragsaw factory.
 Antique Implement Society.  Displays large operating oil and gas engines.
 Willow Creek Railroad. Includes both gasoline and steam-powered engines.
 Oregon Two Cylinder Club.  An association of John Deere enthusiasts; exhibits John Deere Tractors and implements, and operates a  wheat field on the premises.

 Northwest Blacksmith Association.  Operates Powerland's machine shop and blacksmith shop.

 Brooks Historical Society.  Maintains and operates the historic Brooks railroad depot, now relocated to the grounds of Powerland.
 
 Pacific Northwest Truck Museum.  An organization which preserves trucking history and vintage trucks, emphasizing trucking in the Pacific Northwest.  Operates a  indoor museum, with 75 restored trucks on display, divided into two buildings—one containing small trucks such as pickups and delivery vans, the other containing semi-trailers and tractors.

 Oregon Electric Railway Historical Society.  A society dedicated to preserving the regional heritage of electric rail transportation.  The society operates the Oregon Electric Railway Museum at Powerland, and operates a vintage electric trolley which circles the perimeter of the site.

 Oregon Fire Service Museum, Memorial, and Learning Center.  Established in 1993 to preserve the heritage of firefighting in Oregon.  Maintains a collection of antique fire engines of various vintage.
 Oregon Tractor Pullers, Inc.  Operates tractor pulls involving vintage tractors at the site.
 Antique Caterpillar Machinery Museum.  Exhibits equipment manufactured by Caterpillar Inc.
 Willamette Valley Model Railroad Museum.  A museum dedicated to model railroading.

 Northwest Vintage Car & Motorcycle Museum.  A museum dedicated to the heritage of the automobile and motorcycle.  Among the exhibits is a replica of a 1930s Texaco service station.

Great Oregon Steam-Up 

The signature event at Antique Powerland is the Great Oregon Steam-Up, an event held each year during mid-summer when many of the exhibits, normally displayed in a non-operational state, are fired up and shown running.  The Steam-Up includes events such as a parade of vintage power equipment, sawmill demonstrations, demonstrations of using vintage equipment to harvest wheat, and numerous other exhibits.  The year 2010 marked the Steam-Up's 40th anniversary.

References

External links

 Powerland Heritage Park – official site
 Branch 15 - Website of Branch 15

Automobile museums in Oregon
Museums in Marion County, Oregon
Agriculture museums in the United States
Open-air museums in Oregon
Railroad museums in Oregon
Industry museums in Oregon
1970 establishments in Oregon